Petri Korte (born 12 December 1966) is a Finnish former professional darts player who currently playing in Professional Darts Corporation events. He is known for his highly unorthodox throwing action, where he uses his non throwing hand as a guide by holding it up in front of him whilst throwing.

Career

Korte attempted to qualify for the 2010 BDO World Darts Championship but lost in the final round of international qualifiers to Jan Dekker.

He won the Nordic Invitational Singles in 2011. Korte and Sami Sanssi lost in the 2011 BDO British Open Pairs final, 1–3, to Garry Thompson and Scott Waites.

He qualified for the 2012 PDC World Darts Championship, where he beat Per Laursen 4–3 (legs) in the preliminary round. He played world number 3, James Wade, in the first round. Korte went 0–2 down before pulling back a set and then had two darts to level the match. He missed and Wade wrapped up the match 3–1.

Korte represented Finland with Marko Kantele in the 2012 PDC World Cup of Darts and  together they were beaten 4–5 by Croatia in the first round. He lost in two quarter-finals on the Scandinavian tour in the rest of 2012 to finish 17th on the SDC Order of Merit.

World Championship results

PDC

2012: First round (lost to James Wade 1–3) (sets)

References

External links

Living people
Sportspeople from Lahti
Finnish darts players
Professional Darts Corporation associate players
1966 births
PDC World Cup of Darts Finnish team
20th-century Finnish people
21st-century Finnish people